REP(MUS) (Robotic Experimentation and Prototyping using Maritime Uncrewed Systems) is an annual military exercise organized and hosted by the Portuguese Navy and NATO with the participation of forces from foreign military forces, universities and tech companies. The exercise has the objective of testing different types of unmanned aerial vehicles, unmanned surface vehicles and unmanned ground vehicles. Today it is the largest UAV testing exercise, with the participation of several NATO countries.

Objectives 
REP(MUS) allows nations to pool their resources, talent and ingenuity to create better, more flexible and more interoperable maritime unmanned vehicles and systems;

 Demonstration of the web-based tool Ripples' enhanced capabilities for marine situational awareness and multi-domain unmanned vehicle missions;
 Participation in cooperative mine-warfare missions to be performed by Autonomous Underwater Vehicles from several nations;
 Characterization of acoustic and magnetic signatures of the LAUVs in the open ocean;
 Demonstration of a submarine's response to an emergency distress call;
 Underwater acoustic networking communications with fixed and mobile nodes;
 Radio communication exchanges between the LUME small satellite and Unmanned Air Systems;
 Demonstration of UAV capabilities in amphibious landing;
 Demonstration of multi-robot area coverage under varying currents.

REP(MUS)19

Military participants 

 ;
 ;
 ;
 : NRP Tridente, NRP Álvares Cabral, NRP Figueira da Foz, NRP Almirante Gago Coutinho, NRP Dom Carlos I, NRP Andrómeda, NRP Pégaso, Portuguese Marine Corps, Special Actions Detachment and Sappers Divers Group.
 ;
 ;
 : Naval Sea Systems Command and USS Porter.

Civil participants 

 AeroVironment;
IAI Elta Systems;
FEUP;
CMRE;
 University of Hawaiʻi (Applied Research Laboratory);
 EvoLogics

INESC TEC
 LSTS - Laboratório de Sistemas e Tecnologia Subaquática;
 DSTL;
 Universida Vigo.
 OceanScan

REP(MUS)20 
The REP(MUS)20 exercise was canceled due the COVID-19 pandemic, and was replaced by 2 webinar.

REP(MUS)21 
In this edition took part 11 ships, 21 Unmanned aerial vehicles, 32 Unmanned underwater vehicles and 12 Unmanned surface vehicles.

Military participants 

;
 ;
 ;
 ;
 ;
 : FGS Planet;
 ;
 : NRV Alliance (A 5345);
 : Geosia;
 ;
 ;
 : NRP Tridente, NRP Álvares Cabral, NRP Sines, NRP Setúbal, NRP Hidra, NRP Cassiopeia, NRP Dom Carlos I, Portuguese Marine Corps and Sappers Divers Group;
 ;
 ;
 ;
 ;
 : USNS Carson City.

Civilian participants 

FEUP
CMRE
 DSTL
 S&T
 TNO
 Bundeswehr Technical and Airworthiness Center for Aircraft
 Navantia
 AeroVironment
Atlas Elektronik
 CEiia
 Edisoft
 EID, S.A.
 Fibrenamics 
 FKIE
GMV
 GRALL Tech 
 INESC TEC
 SEADRONE
 OceanScanan-mst.c
 Qinetiq
 SDT
 SIEL
 Tecnav 
 Tekever
Think Light
 UTEK
 Marine Instruments 
 Teledyne Technologies
 UAVision
 WavEC

REP(MUS)22 
In the 2022 edition were 45 Unmanned aerial vehicles, 40 Unmanned underwater vehicles and 18 Unmanned surface vehicles, 17 military vessels present and was attended by more than 2000 people from 25 countries, many of them from NATO, as well as companies and universities.

Military participants 

 ;
 ;
 : Participated as observer;
 ;
 ;
 : Commandant Ducuing;
 : FGS Planet;
 ;
 : NRV Alliance;
 : HNLMS Rotterdam, HNLMS Tromp and Geosia;
 ;
 : NRP Bartolomeu Dias, NRP Arpão, NRP Viana do Castelo, NRP Sines, NRP Hidra, NRP Sagitário, NRP Dom Carlos I, NRP Almirante Gago Coutinho, UAM Macaréu, Portuguese Marine Corps, CEOM;
 : Alexandru CĂTUNEANU;
 : Audaz (P-45);
 ;
 : HMS Lancaster and HMS Hurworth;
 : US Navy.

Civilian participants 

 AeroVironment;
 Alpha Unmanned Systems;
 Aselsan;
 CMRE;
 Faculdade de Engenharia da Universidade do Porto;
 INESC TEC;
 Instituto Superior Técnico (AeroTéc) (Núcleo de Estudantes de Engenharia Aeroespacial do Técnico)
 Laboratório de Sistemas e Tecnologia Subaquática;
 Maritime Robotics
 Navantia;
 OceanScan
 Schiebel;
 Sefine Shipyard;
 Swarming Technologies and Solutions;
 Tekever;
 Unmanned Survey Solutions
 UAVision.

See also 
REMUS (AUV)

References 

Military exercises and wargames
Military of Portugal